Jiang Chengji (born 25 November 1975) (born November 25, 1975 in Shanghai) is an international male Chinese butterfly, breaststroke and freestyle swimmer from Shanghai. He competed at the 1996 Summer Olympics in the 100 m butterfly, finishing fourth, 0.07 seconds behind the bronze medal winner. He also finished in 4th place in the 50m freestyle at the same Olympics, 0.04 seconds behind the third-place finisher.

Jiang also participated for China in 2000 Summer Olympics in the 50 m freestyle but failed to pass into the later stages, finishing tied 17th, 0.02 seconds outside the time needed to qualify for the semifinals.

Jiang finished third at the 2004–05 FINA Swimming World Cup in the men's freestyle.

On the national stage Jiang also won a record of five gold medals at the Chinese Ninth National Games.

References

1975 births
Living people
Chinese male butterfly swimmers
Chinese male breaststroke swimmers
Chinese male freestyle swimmers
Olympic swimmers of China
Swimmers from Shanghai
Swimmers at the 1996 Summer Olympics
Swimmers at the 2000 Summer Olympics
Asian Games medalists in swimming
Asian Games gold medalists for China
Asian Games silver medalists for China
Swimmers at the 1994 Asian Games
Swimmers at the 1998 Asian Games
Medalists at the 1994 Asian Games
Medalists at the 1998 Asian Games
20th-century Chinese people
21st-century Chinese people